Grzybów Dolny  is a village in the administrative district of Gmina Żychlin, within Kutno County, Łódź Voivodeship, in central Poland. It has had a population of 119 since 2000.

References

Villages in Kutno County